The Republican Schoolhouse, also known as Little White Schoolhouse or Birthplace of the Republican Party, is a historic former schoolhouse at 305 Blackburn Street in Ripon, Wisconsin.  Built in 1853, it was designated a National Historic Landmark for its role in the 1854 founding of the Republican Party.  It is now a local history museum.

History

Construction
The structure was built in its original location in 1853 as a school. It was championed as part of a wider education initiative by a New York transplant, Alvan Bovay. Bovay used his position in founding the school to further involve himself in politics, becoming a founder of the Republican Party, which formed during a meeting at the schoolhouse.

The building is a single-story wood frame structure, with a gabled roof and clapboarded exterior.  It has modest Greek Revival styling, with a single entrance framed by pilasters and an entablature with cornice.  There are sash windows on either side of the entrance.

Politics
In 1854, opposition grew to the proposed Kansas-Nebraska Bill. The bill was championed by the dominant Democratic Party, and the opposition was split among several smaller parties, including the Whig Party, the Free Soil Party, and some internal Democratic Party splintering. In Ripon, Bovay, who had gotten the schoolhouse built, led the opposition, and canvassed support among opposition members of all the local parties. He called a meeting on March 20. The Whig and Free Soil parties dissolved themselves in favor of forming a new, united party to be called "Republican," with some Democrats also defecting from their local party branch to join the new party. With publicity from the New York Tribune, word of the party spread, other local chapters and state-level parties started forming by July or earlier, and a national party was formed by 1856.

Preservation
The town quickly outgrew the small building, and built a larger brick building to replace it. The old building was sold to Wisconsin governor George Peck, for use as a home.  By the early twentieth century, it had fallen into disuse, and was in danger of being demolished. Due to its historical significance, effort was put into saving the building.

Local civic and historical organizations, considering its local and national historical significance, raised funds to save it. The building was refurbished, and moved to the campus of Ripon College. Later, it was moved twice more to other locations on campus.

Its fourth and final move, in 1951, was to its present location.

Twenty-two years later, it was recognized it as a historic site by the United States National Park Service, which declared it a National Historic Landmark in 1974. From 2005 to 2007, the house underwent a renovation.

It was a one-room schoolhouse.

See also
List of National Historic Landmarks in Wisconsin
National Register of Historic Places listings in Fond du Lac County, Wisconsin

References

External links

National Historic Landmarks in Wisconsin
School buildings on the National Register of Historic Places in Wisconsin
One-room schoolhouses in Wisconsin
Historic American Buildings Survey in Wisconsin
Defunct schools in Wisconsin
Museums in Fond du Lac County, Wisconsin
School buildings completed in 1853
Schoolhouses in the United States
Education museums in the United States
History museums in Wisconsin
Ripon, Wisconsin
Relocated buildings and structures in Wisconsin
National Register of Historic Places in Fond du Lac County, Wisconsin
Republican Party (United States)
Republican Party of Wisconsin